Maciej Urbańczyk (born 2 April 1996) is a Polish professional footballer who plays as a midfielder for Odra Opole.

Career

Stal Mielec
Urbańczyk signed for Stal Mielec on 31 January 2019.

Odra Opole
On 30 June 2022, he moved to I liga side Odra Opole, signing a two-year deal with an extension option.

External links

References

1995 births
Living people
Association football midfielders
Poland youth international footballers
Polish footballers
Ekstraklasa players
I liga players
II liga players
Ruch Chorzów players
Stal Mielec players
Odra Opole players
People from Mikołów
Sportspeople from Silesian Voivodeship